In mathematics, a Hodge algebra or algebra with straightening law is a commutative algebra that is a free module over some ring R, together with a given basis similar to the basis of standard monomials of the coordinate ring of a Grassmannian.

References

Commutative algebra